Calculator spelling is an unintended characteristic of the seven-segments display traditionally used by calculators, in which, when read upside-down, the digits resemble letters of the Latin alphabet. Each digit may be mapped to one or more letters, creating a limited but functional subset of the alphabet, sometimes referred to as beghilos (or beghilosz).

Applications

Aside from novelty and amusement, calculator spelling has limited utility. The popularity of pagers in the 1990s gave rise to a form of leetspeak called pagerspeak.  Students, in particular, experimented with calculators to discover new words.

English

The "original" attributed example of calculator spelling, which dates from the 1970s, is 5318008, which when turned over spells "BOOBIES". Another early example of calculator spelling offered the sequence 0.7734, which becomes "hello", or could also be written as “0.1134”. The 1979 album Five Three One - Double Seven O Four by The Hollies encodes the band's name in calculator spelling ("hOLLIES"). Other words possible with the traditional "BEghILOSZ" set include "LOOSE", "ShELL", "BEIgE", "gOBBLE", "gOOgLE", and many others. Among the longest are "hILLBILLIES" and "SLEIghBELLS" at 11, "gLOSSOLOgIES" and "BIBLIOLOgIES" at 12 letters, and "hEEBEEgEEBEES" at 13 letters.  Another common case, 7734206, spells "gO 2 hELL". 8008 is special in that it can spell "BOOB" upside-down or right-side up.  71077345 spells "SHELLOIL". There are also a couple of names that are able to be calculator spelled. For example, 7718=BILL, 46137=LEIgh, 5107=LOIS, 31773=ELLIE, 317171l3=ELI LILIE (in polish: lily flowers of Elisabeth) and 302=ZOE.

80085 (BOOBS) was used as a gag in the episode Mortyplicity of Rick and Morty. During the episode, Rick Sanchez disables clones of the Smith family with the phrase "Analysis mode; password 80085.". His daughter, Beth Smith, makes the comment "Kinda expected a funnier password."

Scientific and programmer calculators

Scientific calculators that feature hexadecimal readout using the letters A through F offer more flexibility.  Using a scientific calculator with hex capability, the earlier "5318008" example can be improved with the A–F keys to spell "B00B1E5", without needing to rotate the display (a practice known as hexspeak or Base 16).

Students often use this capability and the improved "alpha" feature that use the letters "A" through "Z" to write messages, separating words by using the minus sign ("-") or other punctuation.

In some calculators that use dot matrix displays, a factorial product sign ("!") can be used to add emphasis. For example, "B00B1E5!".

See also
 Ambigram
 ASCII art
 Emoticon
 Hexspeak
 Leetspeek
 Phoneword
 Seven-segment display character representations
 Translit
 Transformation of text

References

Further reading
 Heinrich Hemme: Die Hölle der Zahlen - 92 mathematische Rätsel mit ausführlichen Lösungen, page 19/73 (German)

External links
Calculator Haikus – Some examples and a report of finding a total of 118 English words possible to display using the upside-down technique
A list of 250 calculator-spellable English words – A list of calculator spelling words generated by regular expression search
Topsy-Turvy Calculator – An upside-down calculator
Historias de Calculadora  – A list of calculator-spellable Spanish words, and Logo code to convert them to numbers
The Ultimate List – An 824 word list and an extended 1455 word list of English words possible to display on an upside down calculator, HTML code to aid their creation plus three 'micro stories' using only the available words.
 251 words you can spell with a calculator. – Present&Correct 251 words you can spell with a calculator. (10/27/13)

Calculators
Spelling